Streptomyces virginiae is a bacterium species from the genus of Streptomyces which has been isolated from soil. Streptomyces virginiae produces actithiazic acid, virginiamycins and cycloserine. Streptomyces virginiae also produces monensin A, monensin B, monensin C, monensin D, actithiazic acid.

Further reading

See also 
 List of Streptomyces species

References

External links
Type strain of Streptomyces virginiae at BacDive -  the Bacterial Diversity Metadatabase	

virginiae
Bacteria described in 1952